The 2003 Wellington Sevens, also known as the 2003 New Zealand Sevens, was an international rugby sevens tournament that was held in Wellington, New Zealand as the third leg of the 2002–03 World Sevens Series. The tournament took place at the Westpac Stadium on 7–8 February 2003.

The hosts, New Zealand, won the Cup. 

Niue finished second in the Bowl competition, which was the team's best result at that time.

Format
The teams were drawn into four pools of four teams each. Each team played the other teams in their pool once, with 3 points awarded for a win, 2 points for a draw, and 1 point for a loss (no points awarded for a forfeit). The pool stage was played on the first day of the tournament. The top two teams from each pool advanced to the Cup/Plate brackets. The bottom two teams from each group went to the Bowl/Shield brackets.

Teams
The 16 participating teams for the tournament:

Pool stage

Pool A

Source: Rugby7.com

Pool B

Source: Rugby7.com

Pool C

Source: Rugby7.com

Pool D

Source: Rugby7.com

Knockout stage

Shield

Source: Rugby7.com

Bowl

Source: Rugby7.com

Plate

Source: Rugby7.com

Cup

Source: Rugby7.com

Tournament placings

Source: Rugby7.com

References

2002–03 IRB Sevens World Series
2003 in New Zealand rugby union
2003
Wellington Sevens